This timeline of college football in Kansas sets forth notable college football-related events that occurred in the state of Kansas.

Overview
College football in Kansas began in 1890 and has its roots in the formation of the Kansas Collegiate Athletic Conference.  The first game was played on November 22 that year between Baker University and the University of Kansas.  Games have been played in the state continuously every year ever since.

Timeline
Note: this timeline is incomplete.  You can help Wikipedia by expanding it.

1890s
 1890
 February 15 – The Kansas Intercollegiate Athletic Association is formed.
 November 22 – The first official intercollegiate football game in the state of Kansas is played in Baldwin City, between the University of Kansas and Baker University.  Baker wins, 22–9.
 1891
 October 31 – The first playing of the "Border War" between Kansas and Missouri, in Kansas City, Missouri.  Border War games are played Kansas City until 1911.  In 1912, Kansas hosts the game for the first time in Lawrence.
 1893
 African American Ed Haney plays on the football team for the University of Kansas.
 November 30 – Kansas State competes in its first intercollegiate football game, against St. Mary's College. The Manhattan Mercury reports afterward on its front page: "About 30 spectators and lovers of the game accompanied our college foot ball team to St. Marys on Thanksgiving day and witnessed the defeat of St. Marys' college team by a score of 18 to 10."

1900s
 1902
 October 4 – Kansas State and Kansas play the first game of their long rivalry, a 16–0 Jayhawk win.
 1904
 October 28 – Haskell College faces Carlisle at the 1904 World's Fair in St. Louis, in front of a crowd of 12,000 people, in an early inter-sectional college football "championship" game.
 1905
 October 6 –  Cooper College (Sterling) plays Fairmount (Wichita State) in a night game – the first night college football game west of the Mississippi River.
 December 25 – Washburn and Fairmount play an "experimental" game to test new rules.
 1908
 November 26 – Kansas completes a 9–0 season and clinches the championship of the Missouri Valley Intercollegiate Athletic Association, the first major conference football title won by a state school.

1910s
 1911
 October 21 – Kansas beats Kansas State 6–0. After the teams did not play in 1910, this is the first game in a continuous series that has lasted more than 100 years – the sixth-longest continuous series in college football history.
 November 25 – Over 1,000 people gather in downtown Lawrence to watch a live scale model reenactment of the Kansas Jayhawks game against Missouri.  Game statistics were transmitted by telegraph.
 1913
 Kansas State formally leaves the Kansas Intercollegiate Athletic Association to join the Missouri Valley and compete against the University of Kansas and other larger schools in the region.

1920s
 1928
 December 1 –  The former Kansas Intercollegiate Athletic Conference disbanded to form the Kansas Collegiate Athletic Conference ("little six").

1930s
 1939
 October 28 –  Kansas State's homecoming game against Nebraska is broadcast on W9XAK television.  This is the first college football game broadcast in Kansas and the second anywhere in the nation.

1940s
 1948
 January 1 – Both Wichita State and Kansas play in bowl games on the same date – the first bowl appearances for any of the state's schools.  Wichita State plays in the Raisin Bowl, while KU plays in the Orange Bowl.  After the season ends, WSU's head coach Ralph Graham leaves to coach at his alma mater, Kansas State, which is at the time in the midst of an NCAA-record 28-game losing streak.
 1949
 September 24 – Harold Robinson plays his first game for Kansas State, breaking the modern "color barrier" in Big Eight Conference athletics, and also becoming the first ever African-American athlete on scholarship in the conference.

1950s
 1951
 September 14 – Head coach Harold Hunt of Southwestern gains national praise by rejecting a touchdown when he observes his ball carrier stepping out of bounds.
 Former Washburn Ichabods and Bethany Swedes head coach Bennie Owen is inducted into the College Football Hall of Fame.
 Former Kansas head coach Fielding H. Yost is inducted into the College Football Hall of Fame.
 1955
 Former Haskell football head coach Matty Bell is inducted into the College Football Hall of Fame.
 1957
 December 21 – Pittsburg State wins its first NAIA national championship.

1960s
 1961
 Pittsburg State wins its second NAIA National Title.
 Kansas Sports Hall of Fame is founded.  The organization celebrates all Kansas sports with 19 inductees its first year, including Garfield Weede, Ernie Quigley, Mike Ahearn, Bill Hargiss, and Emil Liston.
1966
 Former Kansas State head coach Pappy Waldorf is voted in to the College Football Hall of Fame.
1969
 October 11 – Kansas State beats KU 26–22, in the first contest in the Governor's Cup series. The game features star players on both sides, with KU led by future Pro Football Hall of Fame running back John Riggins, and KSU led by quarterback Lynn Dickey.
 November 22 - The Kansas State High School Activities Association holds its first state championship games. Previously, there were no playoffs for high school teams, and champions were determined by media polls.

1970s
 1970
 October 2 – Approximately half of the Wichita State University football team dies in a plane crash on way to play a game against Utah State University.
 December 5 – The first Boot Hill Bowl game is played.
 1971
Kansas State High School Activities Association develops and begins using new overtime rules.  These rules become the future standard for overtime in college football.
 1974
 The College of Emporia closes, discontinuing its football program.
 1978
 Former Kansas State head coach Charlie Bachman is voted in to the College Football Hall of Fame.
 1979
 Willie Jeffries is named the head coach at Wichita State, the first African-American head coach of an NCAA Division-I program at a predominantly white school.

1980s
 1980
 November 20 – The first Sunflower Bowl is played.
 November 21 –  The final Boot Hill Bowl game is played.
 1986
 November 15 – The final Sunflower Bowl is played.
 December 2 – Wichita State University discontinues its football program.
 1988
 December 13 - Bill Snyder. the offensive coordinator for the Iowa Hawkeyes, is named Kansas State's new head coach. 
 1989
Emporia State advances to the NAIA National Championship game, losing to Carson-Newman

1990s
 1991
 Pittsburg State wins its first NCAA Division II National Championship and 3rd title overall.
 1992
 Saint Mary of the Plains closes (and also its football program)
 1995
 October 28 – Kansas State and Kansas face each other as ranked football teams for the first time.  KU comes into the game ranked #6 in the nation in the AP Poll, while KSU is ranked #14.  KSU wins the game, 41–7.
 The Wheat Bowl plays its first game.
 1996
 August 31 – Texas Tech plays at Kansas State in the first ever Big 12 Conference football game.
 1998
 November 9 – Kansas State rises to the #1 ranking in the Coaches Poll after improving to 9–0, the first time a state school is ranked first in the nation in the NCAA Division I college football polls. The Wildcats finish the regular season 11-0, but squander a chance to play for the national championship by losing 36-33 in double overtime to Texas A&M in the Big 12 Championship game.

2000s
 2001
 Former Kansas tackle/halfback and former head coach at Kansas, Washburn and Haskell John H. Outland is inducted into the College Football Hall of Fame.
 2002
 Former Wichita State head coach Marcelino Huerta is inducted into the College Football Hall of Fame.
 2004
 Charlie Richard, former head coach at Baker University, is inducted into the College Football Hall of Fame
2005 
 November 19 - Bill Snyder retires after 17 seasons as head coach at Kansas State. 
 2006
 The final Wheat Bowl game is played.
 2007
 November 24 - Kansas, ranked second in the Associated Press poll, has an opportunity to ascend to No. 1 by defeating archrival Missouri at Arrowhead Stadium in Kansas City, Missouri. However, the Tigers win 36-28 and ascend to the top. 
2008
 November 24 - Bill Snyder returns as head coach at Kansas State. His second tenure will last 10 seasons (2009-18). 
 2009
 May 12 – The first Kanza Bowl is played

2010s
 2010
 Former Bethany Swedes head coach Ted Kessinger is inducted into the College Football Hall of Fame, the second Hall of Fame coach from the small school in Lindsborg.
 Former Wichita State head coach Willie Jeffries  is inducted into the College Football Hall of Fame.
 2011
 Pittsburg State win its 2nd NCAA Division II title, its 4th title overall.
 2012
 November 15 – The final Kanza Bowl is played.
 Former Haskell head coach William Henry Dietz is inducted into the College Football Hall of Fame.
 2015
 January 9, 2015 – Kansas State head coach Bill Snyder is inducted into the College Football Hall of Fame
 May 22, 2015 – Haskell University suspends football for the 2015 season.
 2016
Baker University advances to the 2016 NAIA Football National Championship, losing to Saint Francis (Indiana).
 2017
September 2, 2017 – Kansas State football player Scott Frantz becomes the first openly gay college football player to play at the NCAA's highest level. Frantz announced to ESPN prior to the season that he is gay.

See also
 List of college athletic programs in Kansas

References

History of Kansas
Kansas
American football in Kansas